Below are the squads for the 2018 Bandy World Championship final tournament in Russia.

Division A

Group A

Finland
Coach: Antti Parviainen

Norway
Coach:

Russia
Coach: Mikhail Iurev

Sweden
Coach: Svenne Olsson

Group B

Germany
Coach: Dmitry Fihter

Hungary
Coach: Gábor Nagy

Kazakhstan
Coach: Ilyas Khandayev

United States
Coach: Chris Halden

Division B

Group A

China
Coach: Li BinDong

Estonia
Coach: Artem Abramov

Japan
Coach: Oleg Zignnshin

Mongolia
Coach: Mergen Arslan

Group B

Netherlands
Coach: Thomas Engström

Slovakia
Coach: Mikael Bratt

Somalia
Coach: Mursal Ismail Isa

Ukraine
Coach: Magnus Alm

References

Bandy World Championship squads